Laurence Whiteley  (born 29 August 1991) is a British parasport rower. He won gold with Lauren Rowles in the trunk-arms mixed double sculls (TAMix2x) at the 2016 Summer Paralympics.

Background 
Whiteley, who is from Northallerton, North Yorkshire, attended Hurworth House School and Polam Hall School. He competed in triathlons as a youth and was the British Triathlon regional champion for the 13–14 age group. In 2006 at the age of 14 he was diagnosed with osteosarcoma (a form of bone cancer) below his right knee, and was given only a 30% chance of survival by doctors. He had surgery to remove the tumour, during which his knee joint and part of his fibula were removed, and further surgery to replace the joint and insert titanium rods into his leg. He also had chemotherapy over an 11-month period. He learned to walk again after a year of physiotherapy.

Career 
After his recovery Whiteley initially competed as a swimmer, and was national junior champion at 50 m freestyle in the S10 classification. He took up rowing in 2011 at the Tees Rowing Club, initially competing in the non-Paralympic trunk-arms men's single scull category. Since 2014 he has trained with the national squad in Caversham, Berkshire.

After searching for over two years for a suitable partner to compete with in Paralympic double sculls, Whiteley teamed up with Lauren Rowles, a former wheelchair racer who had recently switched to rowing, in early 2015. Their first major championship together was the 2015 World Rowing Championships, where they won the silver medal in the TAMix2x trunk-arms mixed double sculls. At the 2016 Summer Paralympics in Rio, they set a world record in the heats and went on to win gold in the final.

References

External links 
 
 

1991 births
Living people
Paralympic gold medalists for Great Britain
Rowers at the 2016 Summer Paralympics
Medalists at the 2016 Summer Paralympics
Rowers at the 2020 Summer Paralympics
Medalists at the 2020 Summer Paralympics
World Rowing Championships medalists for Great Britain
People from Northallerton
Sportspeople from Scarborough, North Yorkshire
Members of the Order of the British Empire
Paralympic medalists in rowing
Paralympic rowers of Great Britain